Procházka is a very common Czech surname. The feminine variant is Procházková.
A literal translation of the name to English is a stroll.

The name approximates to the English surname "Walker". Other spelling versions include Prochaska, Prohaska and Prohászka.

Procházka may refer to:

 Bedřich Procházka, Czech mathematician
 Bedřich Procházka (rower), Czech rower
 Daniel Procházka, Czech footballer
 František Procházka, Czech ice hockey player
 František Procházka (sport shooter), Czech sport shooter
 Gustav Adolf Procházka, Czech Hussite bishop
 Jaro Procházka (1886–1949), Czech painter
 Jiří Procházka, Czech martial artist
 Jiří Procházka, Czech ice dancer
 Jiří Walker Procházka (born 1959), Czech SF writer
 Josef Procházka, Czech cyclist
 Libor Procházka (born 1974), Czech ice hockey player
 Martin Procházka (born 1972), Czech ice hockey player
 Radek Procházka (born 1978), Czech ice hockey player
 Roman Procházka (born 1989), Slovak footballer
 Stanislav Procházka (born 1973), Czech ice hockey player
 Václav Procházka (born 1984), Czech footballer
 Václav Procházka (equestrian), Czech equestrian
 Zdeněk Procházka, Czech footballer

Prochaska may refer to:

 Eleonore Prochaska Prussian soldier in the Napoleonic Wars
 James O. Prochaska (born 1942), American health psychology theorist
 Ray Prochaska (1919–1997), American football player and coach
 Pauline Prochazka (1842-1930), Irish Watercolour artist

Prohaska may refer to:

 Anna Prohaska, Austrian singer
 Felix Prohaska (1912–1987), Austrian conductor
 Herbert Prohaska (born 1955), Austrian footballer
 Janos Prohaska (1919–1974), Hungarian-born American actor and stunt performer
 Miljenko Prohaska (born 1925), Croatian composer and conductor

Prohászka may refer to:

 Martin Prohászka, Slovak footballer
 Péter Prohászka (born 1992), Hungarian chess grandmaster

Procházková may refer to:

 Alena Procházková (born 1984), Slovak cross country skier
 Petra Procházková (born 1964), Czech war journalist

Czech-language surnames